Joel Manuel Hoffman (also known under the pen name of J. M. Hoffman) is an American scholar, writer, speaker, and novelist known for his criticism of the Christian fundamentalism's style of Biblical interpretation. He has served as a translator for the ten volume series of My People's Prayer Book.

Bibliography

The Warwick Files
Checkpoint (December 2012) 
Revenge (March 2013)

Non-fiction
In the Beginning:  A Short History of the Hebrew Language (2004) 
And God Said: How Translations Conceal the Bible's Original Meaning (2009)
The Bible's Cutting Room Floor: The Holy Scriptures Missing From Your Bible (2014)

As translator
My People's Prayer Book (Volumes 1–10)

References

External links

Lashon.net

Living people
21st-century American novelists
American crime fiction writers
American male novelists
Writers from New York City
1968 births
21st-century American male writers
Novelists from New York (state)